Loleatta Holloway (November 5, 1946 – March 21, 2011) was an American singer known for disco songs such as "Hit and Run" and "Love Sensation". In December 2016, Billboard named her the 95th most successful dance artist of all time. According to the Independent, Holloway is the most sampled female singer in popular music, used in house and dance tracks such as the 1989 single "Ride on Time".

Biography 
Holloway began singing gospel with her mother in the Holloway Community Singers in Chicago and recorded with Albertina Walker in the Caravans gospel group between 1967 and 1971. Holloway was also a cast member of the Chicago troupe of Don't Bother Me, I Can't Cope. Around this time, she met her future producer, manager, and husband Floyd Smith, and recorded "Rainbow ’71" in 1971, a Curtis Mayfield song that Gene Chandler had recorded in 1963. It was initially released on the Apache label, but was picked up for national distribution by Galaxy Records.

In the early 1970s, Holloway signed a recording contract with the Atlanta-based soul music label Aware, part of the General Recording Corporation (GRC), owned by Michael Thevis. Holloway recorded two albums for the label, both of them produced by Floyd Smith — Loleatta (1973) and Cry to Me (1975). Her first single from the second album, the ballad, "Cry to Me" rose to No. 10 Billboard R&B and No. 68 on the Hot 100, but before the label could really establish Holloway, it went out of business.

Top Philadelphia arranger and producer Norman Harris signed Holloway in 1976 for his new label, Gold Mind, a subsidiary of New York's Salsoul Records. The first release from the album Loleatta was another Sam Dees ballad, "Worn Out Broken Heart," which reached No. 25 R&B, but the B-side, "Dreaming," climbed to No. 72 on the pop chart and launched her as a disco act.

She contributed vocals to "Relight My Fire" for Dan Hartman, who then wrote and produced the title track of her fourth and final album for Gold Mind, Love Sensation (1980). 18 of her songs charted on the Hot Dance Music/Club Play chart, including four #1s. However, it was a ballad that proved to be another big R&B hit for her. "Only You" was written and produced by Bunny Sigler, who also sang with Holloway on the track, and it reached No. 11 in 1978.

In the early 1980s, she had another dance hit with "Crash Goes Love" (#5 on the U.S. Dance chart, No. 86 on the US R&B Chart). She also recorded one single, "So Sweet," for the fledgling house-music label DJ International Records. In the late 1980s, her vocals from "Love Sensation" were used in the UK No. 1 hit "Ride on Time" by Black Box. Holloway, however, was uncredited for her vocals. She successfully sued the group, which led to an undisclosed court settlement in her favor.

In 1992, she had a hit with dance band Cappella. There, she appeared billed as Cappella featuring Loleatta Holloway on the single "Take Me Away" (UK #25). Holloway's fortunes dramatically improved, however, when she had her first US No. 1 hit when Marky Mark and the Funky Bunch featured her vocals in the chart-topping "Good Vibrations" (1991). According to Andrew Barker in Variety (March 22, 2011), Holloway performed with Marky Mark and the Funky Bunch to promote the single and she received full vocal credit as well as a share of the royalties. This was shortly after the backlash against various acts such as Milli Vanilli and the groups that used the vocals of Martha Wash, but refused to give her credit until she sued.

More recent dance chart entries included "Share My Joy" (Credited to "GTS Featuring Loleatta Holloway"), "What Goes Around Comes Around" (credited to "GTS Featuring Loleatta Holloway") in 2000, and "Relight My Fire" (credited to "Martin featuring Holloway"), which hit No. 5 in 2003. While not a single, "Like a Prayer", a Madonna cover, was a track on the Madonna tribute album Virgin Voices.  The song "Love Sensation '06" and reached No. 37 on the UK Singles Chart.

Death
Holloway died aged 64 on March 21, 2011, from heart failure. She was survived by her four children.

Discography

Studio albums

Compilation albums
Greatest Hits (1996, The Right Stuff)
Queen of the Night: The Ultimate Club Collection (2001, Salsoul)
The Greatest Performance of My Life: The Best of Loleatta Holloway (2003, Salsoul)
The Anthology (2005, Suss'd)
A Tribute to Loleatta Holloway: The Salsoul Years (2013, Salsoul)
Dreamin': The Loleatta Holloway Anthology 1976–1982 (2014, Big Break)

Singles

As featured performer

Video games
Make My Video: Marky Mark and the Funky Bunch (1992) – Herself (archive footage)

TV series
Re-Micks (2011) – Herself (archive footage)

See also
List of number-one hits (United States)
List of artists who reached number one on the Hot 100 (U.S.)
List of number-one dance hits (United States)
List of artists who reached number one on the U.S. Dance chart
Club Zanzibar (black electronic music venue in 1980s-era Newark, New Jersey)

References

External links 

Loleatta Holloway at Disco-Disco.com

1946 births
2011 deaths
20th-century American singers
21st-century American singers
20th-century African-American women singers
American dance musicians
American garage house musicians
American gospel singers
Singers from Chicago
Salsoul Records artists
20th-century American women singers
21st-century American women singers
American women in electronic music
21st-century African-American women singers